Hyperthelia dissoluta, the yellow thatching grass, is a species of flowering plant in the family Poaceae. It is native to SubSaharan Africa and Madagascar. It has been introduced to Mexico, Central America, Colombia, and Brazil. Its palatability to livestock decreases markedly as the plant matures, and it is a very aggressive competitor, so it has developed a bad reputation among ranchers.

References

Andropogoneae
Flora of West Tropical Africa
Flora of West-Central Tropical Africa
Flora of Northeast Tropical Africa
Flora of East Tropical Africa
Flora of South Tropical Africa
Flora of Southern Africa
Flora of Madagascar
Plants described in 1966